High Franconian or Upper Franconian is a part of High German consisting of East Franconian and South Franconian. It is part of the Franconian languages area, spoken southeast of the Rhine Franconian area. It is spoken in Germany around Karlsruhe, Nuremberg, Erlangen, Fürth, Bamberg, Heilbronn, Meiningen and Würzburg and a small area in France. It is disputed whether it makes sense to summarise East and South Franconian because both are different.

High Franconian is transitional between Upper German and Central German but usually  regarded as Upper German, with similarity to Yiddish.

References

See also 
 Franconian languages

Bavaria
Central German languages
Upper German languages
German dialects
Languages of Germany